Bergsäng is a village situated in Hagfors Municipality, Värmland County, Sweden with 201 inhabitants in 2005. 

Bergsäng has a football club, Bergsängs BK, which as of 2022 is currently in Division 5 of Swedish football.

References 

Populated places in Värmland County
Populated places in Hagfors Municipality